"Straight On" is a song recorded by the rock band Heart. It was released as the first single from the band's 1978 album Dog & Butterfly.  In the U.S., "Straight On" became Heart's third single to crack the top twenty, peaking at number fifteen on the Billboard Hot 100. The song was co-written by Ann Wilson, Nancy Wilson, and Sue Ennis.
"Straight On" was released during Heart's classic era and has been part of the group's setlist almost constantly since its release.  It still was during their 2016 tour.

Background
The song is a mid-tempo rock number which incorporates a funky, almost dance-oriented bass line.  Ann Wilson has called the song Heart's first "dance song", which is likely indicative of its recording and release happening during the disco era of the late 1970s. The lyrics use gambling metaphors to illustrate the protagonist heading straight on for her partner's love.

Cash Box said it has "high-soaring vocals," "a steady bass drum beat" and an "exchange of riffs between guitars." Record World called it "a bluesy rock ballad highlighted by the Wilson sisters' familiar vocals."

Chart performance

In popular culture
A cover of "Straight On" was featured in the jukebox musical movie Strange Magic, performed as a duet between the Bog King and Princess Marianne as they are fighting each other. This scene was used in the movie's promotional materials and referred to as the "duel duet".
The song is used in season one, episode two of On Becoming a God in Central Florida, accompanying Krystal's beauty-pageant-winning puppet dance.
The song also appeared in the videogame Grand Theft Auto IV on the in-game radio station Liberty Rock Radio.

References

Heart (band) songs
1978 singles
Songs written by Sue Ennis
Songs written by Nancy Wilson (rock musician)
Songs written by Ann Wilson
Portrait Records singles
1978 songs
Song recordings produced by Mike Flicker